Brachicheta is a genus of flies in the family Tachinidae.

Species
B. strigata (Meigen, 1824)

References

Tachinidae genera
Exoristinae
Taxa named by Camillo Rondani